Gavin David Bassinder (born 24 September 1979) is an English former professional footballer who played in the Football League for Mansfield Town.

References

1979 births
Living people
English footballers
Association football defenders
English Football League players
Mansfield Town F.C. players
Barnsley F.C. players
Gainsborough Trinity F.C. players
Farsley Celtic F.C. players
Parkgate F.C. players
Brigg Town F.C. players